D2X may be:

 Nikon D2X, a camera manufactured by Nikon
 D2X (source port), an open source port of the game Descent II
 Diablo II: Lord of Destruction, the expansion to Diablo II

ko:D2X